Meij, or similar, may refer to:


Meij
Don Meij (born 1968), Australian business entrepreneur and CEO
Harold Meij (born 1963), Dutch businessman

Meijs
 Lucas Meijs (born 1963), Dutch organizational theorist and professor
 Raymond Meijs (born 1968), Dutch former road cyclist

de Meij
Dave de Meij (born 2001), Dutch footballer 
Johan de Meij (born 1953), Dutch conductor, trombonist, and composer

van der Meij
Henriëtte van der Meij (1850-1945), Dutch leading figure in the first wave feminist movement in the Netherlands
Kim-Lian van der Meij (born 1980), Dutch musical actress, presenter and singer-songwriter

See also 
Van der Meijden
Van der Heijden
Meiji (disambiguation)